The governor of Zamboanga del Sur is the local chief executive of the Philippine province of Zamboanga del Sur. The governor holds office at the Zamboanga del Sur Provincial Capitol. Like all local government heads in the Philippines, the governor is elected via popular vote, and may not be elected for a fourth consecutive term (although the former governor may return to office after an interval of one term). In case of death, resignation or incapacity, the vice governor becomes the governor.

History

Prior to 1952, the whole of Zamboanga was governed by either appointed or elected governors under the historical Moro Province (1903-1914) and Province of Zamboanga (1914-1952). After 1952, then-Governor of Zamboanga Serapio J. Datoc became the province's first governor.

List of Governors

References

Politics of Zamboanga del Sur
Governors of provinces of the Philippines